Joseph Vladimirovich (Volfovich) Trumpeldor (21 November 1880 – 1 March 1920) was an early Zionist activist who helped to organize the Zion Mule Corps and bring Jewish immigrants to Palestine. Trumpeldor died defending the settlement of Tel Hai in 1920 and subsequently became a Jewish national hero. According to a standard account, his last words were "It's nothing, it is good to die for our country", but that he ever said these words has been challenged.

Early life
Joseph Trumpeldor was born in Pyatigorsk in the North Caucasus of the Russian Empire. His father, Wulf Trumpeldor, served as a cantonist in the Caucasian War, and as a "useful Jew", was allowed to live outside the Pale of Settlement. Though proudly Jewish, Trumpeldor's upbringing was more Russian than traditionally Jewish. Originally in training as a dentist, Joseph Trumpeldor volunteered for the Russian army in 1902. During the Russo-Japanese War, he participated in the siege of Port Arthur, where he lost his left arm to shrapnel. He spent a hundred days in the hospital recovering, but elected to complete his service. When he was questioned about his decisions and told that he was heavily advised not to continue fighting given his handicap, he responded "but I still have another arm to give to the motherland." When Port Arthur surrendered, Trumpeldor went into Japanese captivity. He spent his time printing a newspaper on Jewish affairs and organized history, geography and literature classes. He also befriended several prisoners who shared his desire of founding a communal farm in Palestine. On return from captivity, he moved to Saint Petersburg. Trumpeldor subsequently received four decorations for bravery including the Cross of St. George, which made him the most decorated Jewish soldier in Russia.

Due to his handicap he began to study law. He gathered a group of young Zionists around him and in 1911 they immigrated to Palestine, then part of the Ottoman Empire. At first he joined a farm on the shore of the Sea of Galilee, and then worked for a time at Kibbutz Degania.

World War I

When World War I broke out, he was, as a Russian subject in the Ottoman Empire, an enemy alien. He went to Egypt, where together with Ze'ev Jabotinsky he developed the idea of the Jewish Legion to fight with the British against common enemies and the Zion Mule Corps was formed in 1915, considered to be the first all-Jewish military unit organized in close to two thousand years, and the ideological beginning of the Israel Defense Forces. He saw action in the Battle of Gallipoli with the Zion Mule Corps, where he was wounded in the shoulder. The Zion Mule Corps remained in Gallipoli through the entire campaign and was disbanded shortly after being transferred to Britain.

Political activism

In June 1917, Trumpeldor returned to Russia in order to convince the Provisional Government to form a Jewish regiment in the Russian army. According to his plan, the regiment would break through the Turkish front in the Caucasus to Eretz Yisrael. Additionally he organised Jews to defend themselves and established the HeHalutz in Russia, a youth organization that prepared immigrants for aliyah, and returned to Palestine himself.

Battle of Tel Hai

On 1 March 1920, several hundred Shiites, from the village of Jabal Amel in southern Lebanon, gathered at the gate of Tel Hai, one of four Jewish farming villages in an isolated bloc at the northern end of the Upper Galilee's Hulah Valley. Gangs ('isabat) of clan-based border peasants, combining politics and banditry, were active in the area of the loosely defined border between the soon-to-be-established British Mandate of Palestine, French Mandate of Lebanon and of Syria. The Shiites believed that some French troops had taken refuge with the Jews and demanded to search the premises. The Jews generally tried to maintain neutrality in the chaos, occasionally sheltering both Arabs and French. On this day there were no French soldiers, and the Jews assented to a search. One of the farmers fired a shot into the air, a signal for reinforcements from nearby Kfar Giladi, which brought ten men led by Trumpeldor, who had been posted by Hashomer to organize defense.

It is unclear exactly what happened once Trumpeldor assumed command, but an early report speaks of 'misunderstanding on both sides'. Ultimately, a major firefight raged in which seven Jews and five Arabs were killed outright; Trumpeldor was shot in the hand and stomach, and died while being evacuated to Kfar Giladi that evening. The eight Jews were buried in two common graves in Kfar Giladi, and both locations were abandoned for a time.

Last words
The last words attributed to him, "Never mind, it is good to die for our country" (En davar, tov lamut be'ad artzenu ), became well-known in the pre-state Zionist movement and in Israel of the 1950s and 1960s. According to Aviel Roshwald, the authenticity of Trumpeldor's final utterance is well-attested and not questioned by historians despite a widespread belief that they are apocryphal. Other historians state that these words have been under dispute for decades. In the wake of scepticism in the 1970s, a counter-version to the official legend, perhaps starting as a joke, suggested that his last words were in fact a pungent curse in his mother-tongue Russian, reflecting frustration with his bad luck. Trumpeldor spoke only broken Hebrew; in his last hours he mumbled requests in his native Russian to have his wounds bandaged, and the American doctor, George Gerry (or Gary), who attended him, and Abraham Harzfeld were the two first-hand sources for this declaration.

These words, which quickly spread throughout the Jewish immigrant community in Palestine, are rather atypical for Jews on their deathbed. They are the equivalent in Hebrew of the Latin apophthegm Dulce et decorum est pro patria mori, the line from the Roman lyric poet Horace's Odes (III.2.13), which can be rendered in English as "It is sweet and honourable to die for one's country", or "It is sweet and fitting to die for the fatherland" and which inspired numerous nineteenth- and twentieth-century nationalist patriots internationally.

National hero
After his death, Trumpeldor became a symbol of Jewish self-defence, and his memorial day on the 11th day of Adar is officially noted in Israel every year.

Legacy

Both right-wing and left-wing Zionists regard Joseph Trumpeldor as a hero. The Revisionist Zionist movement (the precursor to Likud) named its youth movement Betar, an acronym for "Covenant of Joseph Trumpeldor", while the left-wing movements remember Trumpeldor as the defender of the kibbutzim and have established memorials in his honour. In the same year that he died, the Joseph Trumpeldor Work and Defense Battalion (Gdud HaAvoda) was founded, which established several kibbutzim. The town of Kiryat Shmona ("City of Eight") is named after Trumpeldor and the seven others who died defending Tel Hai.

Israeli rap group Hadag Nahash have a song about Trumpeldor on their debut album Ha-mechona shel ha-groove (2000). The song "Gabi ve Debi" from the 2003 followup Lazuz also mentions Trumpeldor and quotes his famous last words.

The 2015 novel, Joseph's Dream, by Elana Beth Schwab, is based on Trumpeldor's life.

The 2017 Russian-language documentary novel Moi drug Trumpeldor ("My Friend Trumpeldor") by the Saint Petersburg-based author Aleksandr Laskin narrates Trumpeldor's story through the eyes of his friend David Belotserkovsky.

See also
 Trumpeldor Cemetery, Tel Aviv

Notes

References

External links

 The personal papers of Joseph Trumpeldor are kept at the Central Zionist Archives in Jerusalem. The notation of the record group is A42.

1880 births
1920 deaths
Labor Zionists
Betar
Jews from the Russian Empire
Russian Jews in the military
Russian amputees
Russian expatriates in Japan
Emigrants from the Russian Empire to the Ottoman Empire
Russian military personnel of the Russo-Japanese War
Deaths by firearm in Israel
Recipients of the Cross of St. George
Amputees from the Russian Empire
Prisoners of war from the Russian Empire
People from Pyatigorsk